Gocha Gogokhia (born 22 July 1969) is a professional football forward.

Club career
Gocha Gogokhia, started his career in 1993 with Desna Chernihiv the main club of the city of Chernihiv in Ukrainian First League, where he played 13 matches and scored 3 goals. In January 1994 he moved to Stroitel (Brovary) where he played 5 matches. In summer 1994 he moved back to Desna Chernihiv in Ukrainian Second League here he played 14 matches and scored 1 goal. In January 1995 he moved to Vorskla Poltava where he played 7 matches. In summer 1995 he moved to Fakel Varva for three season where he played 46 matches and scored 15 goals. Here he won the Chernihiv Oblast Football Championship in 1995 and 1996 he also won the Chernihiv Oblast Football Cup in 1995. In 1998 he moved back to Desna Chernihiv in Ukrainian First League where in the season 1998–99 he played 21 matches and scored 4 goals. In summer 2000 he moved to Nizhyn where he managed to play 25 matches and scored 13 goals and also here won the Chernihiv Oblast Football Championship in 2000 and the Chernihiv Oblast Football Cup in 2000, 2001 and 2003. In summer 2004 he moved to Yednist Plysky where he played 14 matches and scored 14 goals.

Honours
Nizhyn 
 Chernihiv Oblast Football Championship: 2000
 Chernihiv Oblast Football Cup: 2000, 2001, 2003 

Fakel Varva
 Chernihiv Oblast Football Championship: 1995, 1996
 Chernihiv Oblast Football Cup: 1995

References

External links
Gocha Gogokhia at footballfacts.ru

1969 births
Living people
FC Desna Chernihiv players
FC Vorskla Poltava players
FC Fakel Varva players
FC Yednist Plysky players
SC Korosten players
Footballers from Georgia (country)
Expatriate footballers from Georgia (country)
Expatriate footballers in Ukraine
Expatriate sportspeople from Georgia (country) in Ukraine
Association football forwards